Alberto Toril Domingo (born 1 June 1997) is a Spanish professional footballer who plays as a forward for Spanish club Murcia, on loan from Piast Gliwice.

Club career
Born in Palma de Mallorca, Balearic Islands, Toril represented CD Cala d'Or, CD Olimpic, CD Serverense, CD Manacor and RCD Mallorca as a youth. He made his senior debut with the latter's reserves on 1 November 2015, coming on as a second-half substitute for Lima in a 1–0 Tercera División home win over SD Formentera.

On 13 July 2016, after finishing his formation, Toril moved to Segunda División B side Sestao River Club on a one-year loan deal. The following 11 January, after featuring sparingly, he moved to fellow league team Arenas Club de Getxo also in a temporary deal.

On 10 July 2017, Toril joined UE Olot also in the third tier, on loan for one year. Roughly one year later, he moved to another reserve team, UD Almería B in the same category.

On 1 July 2019, after suffering relegation, Toril signed a contract with Real Murcia still in the third division. On 10 June 2021, he moved abroad and joined Polish Ekstraklasa side Piast Gliwice on a three-year deal.

Toril made his professional debut on 25 July 2021, replacing Michał Żyro in a 2–3 home loss against Raków Częstochowa. He scored his first goal on 14 August, netting his team's third in a 4–3 home win over Wisła Płock.

On 25 January 2023, Toril returned to Real Murcia on loan until the end of the season.

References

External links

1997 births
Living people
Footballers from Palma de Mallorca
Spanish footballers
Association football forwards
Segunda División B players
Tercera División players
RCD Mallorca B players
Sestao River footballers
Arenas Club de Getxo footballers
UE Olot players
UD Almería B players
Real Murcia players
Ekstraklasa players
Piast Gliwice players
Spanish expatriate footballers
Spanish expatriate sportspeople in Poland
Expatriate footballers in Poland